Chen Xiaohong (born 15 May 1963) is a Chinese management science and engineering management specialist, an academician of the Chinese Academy of Engineering, and currently party secretary of Hunan University of Technology and Commerce.

Biography 
Chen was born in Changsha, Hunan, on 15 May 1963, while her ancestral home in Yongxin County, Jiangxi. She received his bachelor's degree and master's degree from Central South University of Technology (now Central South University) in 1983 and 1986, respectively. She received her doctor's degree from Tokyo Institute of Technology in 1999.

She joined the Communist Party in May 1983. Chen taught at Central South University of Technology since 1986, what she was promoted to associate professor in December 1991 and to full professor in September 1994. She also served as dean of Business Administration School from June 1999 to April 2002, and dean of Business School from April 2002 to January 2009. Chen became president of Hunan University of Technology and Commerce, in September 2014, and then party secretary, the top political position in the university, beginning in April 2021. In March 2018, she became a member of the 13th National Committee of the Chinese People's Political Consultative Conference.

Honours and awards 
 2005 State Science and Technology Progress Award (Second Class)
 27 November 2017 Member of the Chinese Academy of Engineering (CAE)

References 

1963 births
Living people
People from Changsha
Engineers from Hunan
Central South University alumni
Tokyo Institute of Technology alumni
Academic staff of the Central South University
Members of the Chinese Academy of Engineering
Members of the 13th Chinese People's Political Consultative Conference